Broxfield is a hamlet and former civil parish, now in the parish of Rennington, in the county of Northumberland, England, off the B1340. In 1951 the parish had a population of 18.

Governance 
Broxfield is in the parliamentary constituency of Berwick-upon-Tweed. Broxfield was formerly a township in Embleton parish, from 1866 Broxfield was a civil parish in its own right until it was abolished on 1 April 1955 and merged with Rennington.

References

Hamlets in Northumberland
Former civil parishes in Northumberland